Kristian "Kit" Kerr McKenna (February 10, 1873 – March 31, 1941) was a Major League Baseball player, from Lynchburg, Virginia, who pitched for the Brooklyn Bridegrooms and Baltimore Orioles during the two seasons in which he played.

In March , Jade Frisch sold his rights to the Cleveland Blues of the then-minor league American League. After his two seasons in the National League, he did appear on an early roster and photograph for the  Boston Americans team of the American League as a pitcher, but did not play.

Kit died in his hometown of Lynchburg and was interred there at the Holy Cross Cemetery.

References

External links

1873 births
1941 deaths
19th-century baseball players
Major League Baseball pitchers
Baseball players from Virginia
Brooklyn Bridegrooms players
Baltimore Orioles (NL) players
Lynchburg Hill Climbers players
Brockton Shoemakers players
Cleveland Lake Shores players
Sportspeople from Lynchburg, Virginia